The 1983 Five Nations Championship was the 54th series of the rugby union Five Nations Championship.

Including the previous incarnations as the Home Nations and Five Nations, this was the 89th series of the northern hemisphere rugby union championship. Ten matches were played between 15 January and 19 March. For the 17th time, the championship was shared. France and Ireland finished level on points, and no tie-break procedure existed before 1993. It was France's 5th shared title, and Ireland's 8th.

French wing Patrick Estève scored a try against each other team in this tournament, finishing as the top try scorer, with five tries. This was the first time since 1925 that such a feat had been achieved.

Participants
The teams involved were:

Table

Squads

Results

References

External links

The official RBS Six Nations Site
1983 Five Nations Championship at ESPN

Six Nations Championship seasons
Five Nations
Five Nations
Five Nations
Five Nations
Five Nations
Five Nations
 
Five Nations
Five Nations
Five Nations